Typhoon Wayne, known in the Philippines as Typhoon Miding, is one of the longest-lived tropical cyclones on record in the north-western Pacific Ocean.  The system meandered for 21 days in August–September 1986 between the South China Sea and far western tropical North Pacific Ocean, staying within the monsoon trough and causing heavy rains across the Philippines, Taiwan, southeast China, Hainan Island, and Vietnam. Its maximum sustained winds peaked at category two strength on the Saffir–Simpson scale. Various signals were raised for Hong Kong three times due to Wayne's unusual track. A total of 490 perished, and the storm caused US $399 million (1986 US dollars) in damage.

Meteorological history

This system began its long life on August 16 in the South China Sea, having formed within the monsoon trough. It drifted to the southwest, then looped back to the northwest, becoming a tropical storm on August 18. Wayne, which remained embedded in the monsoon trough throughout its lifetime, turned to the northeast in response to a relocation of the trough, and became a typhoon according to the Joint Typhoon Warning Center (JTWC) on August 19, and on August 20 according to the Japan Meteorological Agency (JMA). At 2 p.m. that day, the ship M. V. Fossarus recorded  winds just west of its center. The typhoon came close but remained offshore of southeastern China, and after reaching maximum sustained winds of  it hit western Taiwan on August 22. The building subtropical ridge forced Wayne west and southwestward through the Luzon Strait, where after weakening to a tropical storm it restrengthened briefly to a typhoon on August 24, according to the Joint Typhoon Warning Center.  The JMA did not upgrade Wayne back to a typhoon during this segment of Wayne's existence.

Vertical shear caused Wayne to weaken to a depression on August 25 according to the Joint Typhoon Warning Center, and August 26 according to the JMA, as the cyclone began to rotate around the circulation of Vera to its north. Tropical Depression Wayne sped up to the northeast, but when Vera moved far enough away, Wayne drifted northeastward through the South China Sea, becoming a tropical storm again on August 27. Ridging to its north forced Wayne southward, where it again became a typhoon on August 30 according to the Joint Typhoon Warning Center, and August 31 according to the JMA. Wayne passed close to northern Luzon on September 2 as a  typhoon, but turned back to the west. The JMA lowered Wayne back to a tropical storm on September 3 before restrengthening the cyclone back into a typhoon by early September 4. On September 4 while moving quickly westward through the South China Sea, Wayne reached a peak of  winds according to the Joint Typhoon Warning Center, or  winds according to the JMA, before it weakened due to land interaction. It hit northern Hainan on September 5 as an  typhoon. Wayne then entered the Gulf of Tonkin, and made its final landfall over Ha Nam Ninh in northern Vietnam later on that day, as a tropical storm. On September 6, Wayne dissipated over Vietnam/Laos border, after 85 JTWC advisories. The storm was one of the longest lasting Western Pacific tropical cyclones in recorded history.

Preparations

In Hong Kong, the Stand By Signal 1 was hoisted at 11:30 a.m. on August 19. As Wayne approached, the Strong Wind Signal 3 was raised at 11:00 a.m. on August 20.  During its first approach, the Northeast Gale/Storm Signal 8 was issued at 10 p.m. on August 20. As winds relaxed, the Strong Wind Signal 3 replaced the Storm Signal 8 at 2 a.m. on August 21, with all signals lowered by 5 a.m. on August 21. During Wayne's second approach, the Stand By Signal 1 was raised at 11:45 a.m. on August 25. Signals were again lowered once Wayne moved farther away at 2:35 p.m. on August 26.  During Wayne's third approach, the Stand By Signal 1 was hoisted at 1:30 a.m. on September 4. As Wayne continued its approach, the Strong Wind Signal 3 was raised at 3 p.m. the same day. Once Wayne moved away to the west of the area, signals were lowered for their final time at 2:10 p.m. on September 5.

Impact
During its passage of Taiwan, 63 died, 12,000 houses collapsed, and a thousand fishing vessels were wrecked. Total damage to the island reached US$360 million (1986 dollars). As a result of its consistent variance in track and drifting track, Wayne brought torrential rains through its path to the Philippines, Taiwan, southeastern China, Hainan Island, and Vietnam. Thirty-six perished in the Philippines. A total of 490 fatalities (with dozens of casualties in Vietnam), tens of thousands left homeless, and US$399 million (1986 dollars) in damage can be attributed to Typhoon Wayne. Despite its impact on the region and longevity, the name Wayne was not retired from the western Pacific naming list, being used again in 1989. At the same time, President Corazon Aquino declared a state of calamity over Northern Luzon.

See also

Typhoons in the Philippines
Typhoon Nari (2001) - a long-lived and erratic storm that affected Taiwan 
Typhoon Tembin (2012) - a long-lived typhoon that affected the Philippines and then Taiwan twice in its lifetime
Tropical Storm Haima (2011)
Tropical Storm Bebinca (2018)
Typhoon Rita (1972) – the second longest-lasting tropical cyclone in the Northwest Pacific
Typhoon Noru (2017) — tied for second longest-lasting Northwest Pacific Tropical cyclone.
Hurricane John (1994) — second longest lived tropical cyclone globally and the farthest travelling tropical cyclone ever
Cyclone Freddy (2023) — longest lived tropical cyclone globally

References

Typhoons in the Philippines
1986 Pacific typhoon season
Typhoon Wayne
Typhoons in Hong Kong
Typhoons in Taiwan
Typhoons
Wayne